Marlon Jansen (born 16 May 1980) is a South African cricket umpire. He has stood in matches in the 2016–17 Sunfoil 3-Day Cup and the 2016–17 CSA Provincial One-Day Challenge tournaments.

References

External links
 

1980 births
Living people
South African cricket umpires
Sportspeople from Bloemfontein